Lauenburg, or Lauenburg an der Elbe, is a town in the state of Schleswig-Holstein, Germany. It is situated on the northern bank of the river Elbe, east of Hamburg. It is the southernmost town of Schleswig-Holstein and belongs to the Kreis (district) of Herzogtum Lauenburg.

History
The town was founded in 1182 by Bernard of Ascania, the ancestor of the Dukes of Lauenburg. It took its name from that of the castle of Lowenborch (erected here between 1181 and 1182), deriving from Lave, the Polabian-language name of the Elbe (compare modern Czech Labe).

Saxe-Lauenburg was a duchy until 1 July 1876, when it was incorporated into the Royal Prussian Province of Schleswig-Holstein. Lauenburg served as the ducal capital until 1616, when the castle burnt down. In 1619 the capital was moved to Ratzeburg. The area of the duchy was roughly identical with that of today's district. In medieval times Lauenburg was a waypoint on the Old Salt Route, while today it is the southern terminus of the Elbe-Lübeck Canal.

Following the Napoleonic Wars, Lauenburg was ceded by Prussia to Denmark in exchange for the region of Pomerania.

Between 1945 and 1982 Lauenburg served as West German inner German border crossing for cars travelling along Bundesstraße 5 between the Soviet Zone of occupation in Germany (till 1949), thereafter the East German Democratic Republic, or West Berlin and the British zone of occupation (till 1949) and thereafter the West German Federal Republic of Germany. The traffic was subject to the Interzonal traffic regulations, that between West Germany and West Berlin followed the special regulations of the Transit Agreement (1972).

Culture and sights

Lauenburg is a notable old town with a number of historic buildings from the 17th century and earlier. In the past these houses were mostly the homes of sailors. Today, the area appeals to artists as well as tourists. Furthermore, the Maria-Magdalenen Church, built in the 13th century is another attraction of the old town of Lauenburg. The old town is nestled at the bottom of about 50 meter high bluffs. The picturesque narrow streets up the hill lead to the so-called "upper town" where Lauenburg Castle is located. The old Lauenburg Castle used to be the residence of the Dukes of Lauenburg and the political centre of the Dukedom. Over the century most parts were destroyed and replaced by modern buildings. Though, the old castle tower remains till today. Nowadays, the castles serves as city and municipal administration. A walk up to the castle is worth the effort though, because of the view. One cannot only see the beautiful river Elbe and the old town of Lauenburg, but also the flat marshland of Lower-Saxony on the southern shore of the Elbe, which used to belong to the duchy until it was ceded to the then neighbouring Kingdom of Hanover in 1814. Another historic sight of Lauenburg is the "Palmschleuse", a historic river lock, originally built in 1398 and renewed in the 17th century. It is the oldest such lock in Europe.

Notable residents
 Bernard II, Duke of Saxe-Lauenburg (1385/1392–1463), ruler
 Eric I, Duke of Saxe-Lauenburg-Ratzeburg (c. 1280–1360), ruler
 Eric II, Duke of Saxe-Lauenburg-Ratzeburg (1318/20–1368), ruler
 Eric IV, Duke of Saxe-Lauenburg (1354–1411), ruler
 Eric V, Duke of Saxe-Lauenburg (died 1436), ruler
Mathilde Block (1850–1932), painter, embroiderer
 Karl Ludwig Harding (1765–1834), astronomer
 John V, Duke of Saxe-Lauenburg (1439–1507), ruler, reconstructed Lauenburg Castle
 Jürgen Plagemann (born 1936), rower, won Olympic silver in 1964

International relations

Lauenburg is twinned with:
 Boizenburg (Germany)
 Dudelange (Luxembourg)
 Lębork (Poland) (formerly Lauenburg in Pommern)
 Manom (France)

References

External links
 
 Altstadt-Lauenburg 

Towns in Schleswig-Holstein
Inner German border
Herzogtum Lauenburg
Populated riverside places in Germany
Populated places on the Elbe